Gérard Hausser (born 18 March 1939 in Strasbourg) is a former French footballer.

During his career he played for RC Strasbourg (1959–67, 1971–74), Karlsruher SC (1967–68), and FC Metz (1968–71). He earned 14 caps and scored two goals for the France national football team from 1965 to 1966, and played in the 1966 FIFA World Cup.

References

External links
Gérard Hausser at the French federation official site 
Profile 

1939 births
Living people
Footballers from Strasbourg
French footballers
France international footballers
1966 FIFA World Cup players
RC Strasbourg Alsace players
Karlsruher SC players
FC Metz players
Ligue 1 players
Ligue 2 players
Bundesliga players
ASPV Strasbourg players
Association football forwards